Eliezer Igra (born 1954/5714) is a rabbi, dayan of the Upper Beit Din of Israel, the Av Beit Din of the Beersheba Beit Din, and the Moshav Rabbi of Kfar Maimon. Igra was a Religious Zionist candidate for Chief Rabbi of Israel in the 2013 nominations for that position. On 21 February 2013, at a convention of leading Religious Zionist rabbis, Igra was voted the leading candidate in a secret ballot, though this vote is not binding and merely a popular declaration of support. Shortly before the actual elections took place, Igra withdrew from the race.

Eliezer Igra began learning at Yeshivat Kerem B'Yavneh during which time the Yom Kippur War and he took part in the fighting. After the war, Igra was placed in the battalion commanded by Yonatan Netanyahu whom with he studied Torah. In 1989, at the young age of 33, he was nominated by the Chief Rabbis Mordechai Eliyahu and Avraham Shapira to be a dayan at the Beersheba Beit Din.

Igra is married to Ruhama (wedded by Rabbi Isser Yehuda Unterman) and has nine children.

References

1954 births
Living people
Israeli Orthodox rabbis
20th-century Israeli rabbis
21st-century Israeli rabbis
Chardal